One 31, fully known as Channel One 31 and branded as One31 or One HD 31, is a Thai digital terrestrial television channel owned by GMM Grammy under The One Enterprise. The network offers a variety of content such as drama, variety programs, competition, news and entertainment programs.

One 31 first aired on December 1, 2011 with the name 1-Sky One (วัน-สกาย วัน) with content and television programs produced by companies under GMM Grammy. On April 1, 2012, it changed its name into GMM Z Hitz (จีเอ็มเอ็มแซต ฮิตส์).

On November 1, 2012, the channel changed its name to GMM One. Its current name, One 31 was adopted on December 2, 2015.

References

External links

Television stations in Thailand
GMM Grammy
Television channels and stations established in 2011